The 2016 División Profesional season (officially the 2016 Copa TIGO-Visión Banco for sponsorship reasons) was the 82nd season of top-flight professional football in Paraguay.

Teams

Stadia and location

Torneo Apertura
The Campeonato de Apertura, also the Copa TIGO-Visión Banco for sponsorship reasons, was the 113th official championship of the Primera División, called "Abraham Zapag", and the first championship of the 2016 season. It began on January 22 and ended on May 22.

Standings

Results

Top goalscorers

Source: Soccerway

Torneo Clausura
The Campeonato de Clausura, also the Copa TIGO-Visión Banco for sponsorship reasons, was the 114h official championship of the Primera División, called "Centenario de la Conmebol", and the second championship of the 2016 season. It began on July 8 and ended on December 18.

Standings

Results

Top goalscorers

Source: Soccerway

Aggregate table

Relegation
Relegations is determined at the end of the season by computing an average of the number of points earned per game over the past three seasons. The two teams with the lowest average are relegated to the División Intermedia for the following season.

 Source: APF

See also
2016 in Paraguayan football

References

External links
APF's official website 
2016 season on RSSSF

Paraguay
1
Paraguayan Primera División seasons